Ectoedemia erythrogenella is a moth of the family Nepticulidae. It is found from the coast of southern Great Britain and western France to the Iberian Peninsula, Corsica, Sardinia, Sicily, Greece and Cyprus.

The wingspan is 4.1-5.6 mm. Adults are on wing from May to July. There is one generations per year.

The larvae feed on Rubus sanguineus and Rubus ulmifolius. They mine the leaves of their host plant. The mine consists of a narrow corridor, largely filled with frass and following a vein. Now and then, a hairpin turn occurs. The corridor widens into an elongate blotch with dispersed black frass in the base or along the sides. Generally the leaf around the mine is intensely coloured wine red over a large area.

There is a very long period of larval feeding. In the northern part of its range larvae from September until November, but in the south larvae can be found all over the winter until March, April and occasionally later.

External links
Bladmineerders.nl
A Taxonomic Revision Of The Western Palaearctic Species Of The Subgenera Zimmermannia Hering And Ectoedemia Busck s.str. (Lepidoptera, Nepticulidae), With Notes On Their Phylogeny

Nepticulidae
Leaf miners
Moths described in 1908
Moths of Europe
Taxa named by Joseph de Joannis